Hayden Bridge may refer to:

 Hayden Bridge (Alsea, Oregon)
 Hayden Bridge (Springfield, Oregon)

See also 

 Haydon Bridge (disambiguation)